Baumea is a genus of the sedge family, which includes around 30 species native to Madagascar and the Pacific Islands, with 15 species in Australia. All are perennial rhizomatous herbs, with leaves and stems very similar in appearance. The inflorescence is terminal, with the flowers tightly clustered or loosely arranged. The fruits are small nuts.

It is closely related to the genus Machaerina, and is sometimes included in that genus.

Habitat and cultivation
Most species occur in open moist habitats; many are found in swamps or seasonally inundated areas. Baumea is propagated from transplants, divisions, or from seeds, which germinate readily if sown on damp organic mix and kept moist until shoots appear.

Selected species
Baumea acuta (Labill.) Palla	
Baumea arthrophylla (Nees) Boeckeler
Baumea articulata (R.Br.) S.T.Blake
Baumea juncea (R.Br.) Palla	
Baumea laxa (Nees) Boeckeler	
Baumea preissii Nees	
Baumea riparia (Nees) Boeckeler
Baumea rubiginosa (Spreng.) Boeckeler	
Baumea vaginalis (Benth.) S.T.Blake

References

 
Cyperaceae genera